Golema or Golma may refer to:
 Bala Golema
 Pain Golema

 
golma گُلماء = گُل + ماء == گُل + آب

کلمه ترکیبی ایرانی عربی.